Josephat Kiprono (born 12 December 1973) is a Kenyan distance and marathon runner. He participated at the IAAF World Half Marathon Championships in 1996 and won a silver medal finishing behind Italian Stefano Baldini. Kiprono won three marathons in his career: Berlin (1999), Rome (2000), and Rotterdam (2001). His Rotterdam time of 2.06:50 hours which was the best marathon performance in 2001. His personal best in the classic distance is 2:06:44, ran at the 1999 Berlin Marathon.

Achievements

References

External links

marathoninfo

1973 births
Living people
Kenyan male long-distance runners
Berlin Marathon male winners
Kenyan male cross country runners
Recipients of the Association of International Marathons and Distance Races Best Marathon Runner Award